Henricus edwardsiana is a species of moth of the family Tortricidae. It is found in the United States in Arizona and California.

References

Moths described in 1884
Henricus (moth)